Nicolas Werth (born 1950 in Paris) is a French historian.

Biography 
Werth is a scholar of communist studies. He is the son of Alexander Werth, a Russian born British journalist and writer who lived in the USSR during World War II.

Work 
Nicolas Werth has taught abroad (Minsk, New York, Moscow, Shanghai). He served as Cultural Attaché at the French Embassy in Moscow during perestroika from 1985 to 1989. Werth joined the CNRS in 1989, where he devoted himself to History of the Soviet Union. His research has focused, among other things, on state violence and social resistance in the years 1920–1930.

He wrote the chapters dedicated to the USSR in The Black Book of Communism. He was the historic consultant for the French television documentary film, Staline: le tyran rouge, broadcast on M6 in 2007, and is co-author with Patrick Rotman and François Aymé of Gulag, The Story, broadcast on Arte in 2019.

Selected Bibliography
 Être communiste en URSS sous Staline. Paris: Gallimard, 1981.
 La Vie quotidienne des paysans russes de la Révolution à la collectivisation (1917-1939). Paris: Hachette, 1984.
 Rapports secrets soviétiques. La société russe dans les rapports confidentiels, 1921-1991. With Gaël Moullec. Paris: Gallimard, 1995.
 Histoire de l'Union soviétique de Lénine à Staline. Paris: Presses Universitaires de France, 1995.
 Histoire de l'Union soviétique de Khrouchtchev à Gorbatchev. Paris: PUF, 1998.
 1917 : La Russie en Révolution. coll. "Découvertes Gallimard" (nº 327), Paris: Gallimard, 1998.
 "Un État contre son peuple. Violences, répressions, terreurs en URSS de 1917 à 1953," in Stéphane Courtois (ed.), Le Livre noir du communisme. Paris: Robert Laffont, 1998, pp. 45–313.
 Histoire de l'Union soviétique. De l'Empire russe à la Communauté des États indépendants, 1900-1991. 6th Edition. Paris: PUF, 2008.
 Les Procès de Moscou (1936-1938). Éditions Complexe, nouvelle édition revue et augmentée, 2006, 
 .
 L'Ivrogne et la marchande de fleurs : Autopsie d'un meurtre de masse, 1937-1938. Paris: Tallandier, 2009.
 La Terreur et le désarroi. Staline et son système. Paris: Perrin, 2007.
 L'Ivrogne et la marchande de fleurs : Autopsie d'un meurtre de masse, 1937–1938. Paris: Tallandier, 2009.
 L'État soviétique contre les paysans: Rapport secrets de la police politique (Tcheka, GPU, NKVD) 1918-1939. With Alexis Berelowitch. Paris: Tallandier, 2011.
La route de la Kolyma. Paris: Editions Belin, 2012.
Le Goulag. Témoignages et archives. Paris: Robert Laffont, collection Bouquins, 2017 (in collaboration with Luba Jurgenson).
Les révolutions russes. Paris: PUF, 2017.
Le cimetière de l'espérance. Essais sur l'histoire de l'Union soviétique, 1917-1991. Paris: Perrin, 2019.
Les grandes famines soviétiques. Paris: PUF, 2020.

References

External links
  Nicolas Werth on the Institut d'histoire du temps présent
 

Living people
1950 births
Historians of communism
20th-century French historians
21st-century French historians
French people of Russian descent
Academic staff of the School for Advanced Studies in the Social Sciences
ENS Fontenay-Saint-Cloud-Lyon alumni
French National Centre for Scientific Research scientists
French male writers
Writers from Paris
Cultural attachés